Seleke Botsime (born 1975) is a South African guitarist, composer, and musician. Born in Mangaung in the Free State, this singer specializes in jazz and performs at assorted gigs and events all over the country, and in neighbouring countries. He has released an album called CONFRONTATION which contains eleven tracks, including the hit, Zimbabwe.

References

1975 births
Living people
South African jazz musicians
People from Bloemfontein